Catholic University of Maule (UCM) is a university in Maule, Chile. It is a derivative university part of the Chilean Traditional Universities.

This university was created in 1991, in what was the former Talca campus of the Pontifical Catholic University of Chile.

It also has a campus in Curico.

External links

Official site

Catholic universities and colleges in Chile
Forestry education
Curicó
1991 establishments in Chile